Emil Makai (17 November 1870 – 6 August 1901), born Emil Fischer, was a Hungarian-Jewish poet, journalist, dramatist, and translator.

Biography
Born to Rabbi Antal Enoch Fischer in Makó, Makkai went to Budapest in 1884, where he distinguished himself at the Budapest rabbinical seminary as a student by his poetical talent.

In 1888, Makai published his first volume of poetry, Vallásos énekek ("Religious Songs"). This was followed by a Biblical drama, Absalon (1891), and Zsidó költők ("Jewish Poets," 1892), translations of medieval Hebrew poetry, including the works of Shlomo ibn Gabirol, Yehudah ha-Levi, Shmuel ha-Nagid, Moshe ibn Ezra, Avraham ibn Ezra, Yehuda al-Harizi, and Imanuel ha-Romi. In 1893, his version of the Song of Songs (Énekek éneke) was published. From 1892 Makai translated more than 100 dramas and operettas, included Abraham Goldfaden's Sulamit and Bar Kochba.

Works

 Vallásos énekek ("Religious Songs", 1888)
 Absolon ("Absalom", 1891)
 Komédiások (1891)
 Zsidó költők ("Jewish Poets", 1892)
 Énekek éneke ("Song of Songs", 1893)
 Margit (1896)
 A királyné apródja (1899)
 Robinzonok (1899)
 Tudós professzor Hatvani ("The Learned Professor Hatvani", 1900)

Translations

 Toto és Tata (1895)
 A kék asszony (1897)
 Jáfet tizenkét felesége (1898)
 A görög rabszolga (1899)
 A modell (1901)
 A kölcsönkért vőlegény (1901)

References

1870 births
1901 deaths
Hungarian Jews
Jewish poets
Jewish translators
People from Makó
Writers from Budapest
19th-century translators